Anton Hodey (born 29 August 1908, date of death unknown) was a German racing cyclist. He rode in the 1935 Tour de France.

References

External links
 

1908 births
Year of death missing
German male cyclists
Place of birth missing
Sportspeople from Essen
Cyclists from North Rhine-Westphalia